Stealing thunder is to use someone else's idea for one's own advantage, or to pre-empt them.

Origin
The idiom comes from the peevish dramatist John Dennis early in the 18th century, after he had conceived a novel idea for a thunder machine for his unsuccessful 1709 play Appius and Virginia and later found it used at a performance of Macbeth.  There is an account of it in The lives of the poets of Great Britain and Ireland by Robert Shiels and Theophilus Cibber:

Rhetorical use
In a contentious situation, such as a court case, political debate or public relations crisis, it is a tactic used to weaken the force of an adverse point. By introducing the point first and being open about it or rebutting it, the force of the opposition's argument is diminished – their thunder is stolen.

References

Plagiarism
Public relations terminology
Rhetoric